Framing Agnes is a 2022 Canadian documentary film, directed by Chase Joynt. An examination of transgender histories, the film centres on Joynt and a cast of transgender actors reenacting various case studies from Harold Garfinkel's work with transgender clients at the University of California, Los Angeles.

Synopsis 
The film explores the concept of the trans icon. It uses a hybrid format, combining scholarly analysis with clips based on archived interviews, filmed with transgender actors.

Background 
The film is an expansion of Joynt's short film of the same title, which premiered in 2019.

Cast 
The cast includes Angelica Ross, Zackary Drucker, Jen Richards, Max Wolf Valerio, Silas Howard and Stephen Ira.

Release and reception 
The film premiered at the 2022 Sundance Film Festival, where Joynt won both the Audience Award and the Innovator Prize in the NEXT program. In a critical review in Paste, Shayna Maci Warner wrote, "As a cinematic experience, the film feels pulled in several directions, formally incomplete and jagged." IndieWire's review was similarly mixed, commenting negatively on the high proportion of academic content in the documentary, making it "feel more a history class than a story."

The film was longlisted for the Jean-Marc Vallée DGC Discovery Award, and shortlisted for the DGC Allan King Award for Best Documentary Film at the 2022 Directors Guild of Canada awards.

References

External links

2022 films
2022 documentary films
2022 independent films
2022 LGBT-related films
Canadian documentary films
Canadian LGBT-related films
Transgender-related documentary films
Canadian films based on actual events
Sundance Film Festival award winners
LGBT-related films based on actual events
2020s English-language films
2020s Canadian films